= Setoerysiphe =

Scientific classification
- Kingdom: Fungi
- Division: Ascomycota
- Class: Leotiomycetes
- Order: Helotiales
- Family: Erysiphaceae
- Genus: Setoerysiphe; Y. Nomura

Genus of fungi

Setoerysiphe is a genus of fungi in the family Erysiphaceae.
